Valkyrie Elysium is an action role-playing video game developed by Soleil and published by Square Enix. It was released on September 29, 2022 for PlayStation 4 and PlayStation 5, and on November 11, 2022 for Windows. Part of the Valkyrie Profile series, it was the first home console installment in more than 15 years, and the third overall. Like its predecessors, the game is significantly based on Norse mythology, and follows Maria, a valkyrie who is created to find and purify souls to help an injured Odin defeat Fenrir, during Ragnarok. However, Elysium, a spiritual sequel, uses an action, rather than turn-based, battle system. The game received mixed reviews from critics, who praised the game's character design, artwork, combat system, voice acting, and music. However, the narrative was criticized as weak, and the graphical quality was seen as low-budget, with environments lacking in detail or things to interact with.

Plot 
The game follows Maria, a valkyrie and lesser god created by Odin, the "All-Father". She is sent to find and purify souls on Midgard so as to bolster support for Odin, using the Einherjar, resurrected warriors who further Odin's cause. Each Einherjar has their own story of what led to their demise.

Reception 

The game received an aggregate score of 65/100 on Metacritic, indicating "mixed or average reviews".

Paul Shkreli of RPGamer rated the game's PS5 version 3.5/5 points, noting that its existence felt like a "miracle in itself" due to the series' long dormancy. He opined that while the game's combat system did not line up with what fans expected for a continuation of the series, the gameplay and music were good when judged on their own merits. Shkreli called the character designs and art "gorgeous", and the transition to action combat "gracefully handled", saying that it felt like an "organic and natural" successor. However, he called the world "mostly empty" save for enemies, remarking that it did not feel like a world in need of saving, and noted that the graphical quality varied greatly. He also described the world-building as "paper thin", with a "sparse" story that was "brief and predictable".

Chris Shive of Hardcore Gamer also rated the PS5 version 3.5/5 points, calling the excitement about a return to the franchise "short-lived" when it was shown to be action-based. He said that, despite the "bare bones" story, the battle system "delivers", calling it enjoyable throughout the game despite being "rough around the edges". Saying that it had the potential to be a great game, he nevertheless called the execution too uneven and "minimal", and the storytelling and level design "uninspired". Josh Torres of RPG Site rated the game 7/10 points, praising the battle system, but calling every other aspect of the game "mediocre". He described the story as "barebones and predictable", saying that the living NPCs of previous games were much more "poignant" than Elysium's Hollow Blossoms, voices of people who were already dead. He also criticized the presentation of the Einherjar memories, saying they compared unfavorably with the Thousand Years of Dreams from Lost Odyssey. He ultimately expressed his hope that the series would not be "overtaken" by the gameplay style going forward, and that it would continue to be a spin-off.

References

External links
 

Valkyrie Profile
2022 video games
Action role-playing video games
PlayStation 4 games
PlayStation 5 games
Single-player video games
Video games about valkyries
Video games featuring female protagonists
Windows games
Video games developed in Japan
Square Enix games